"Gone as a Girl Can Get" is a song written by Jerry Max Lane and recorded by American country music artist George Strait. It was released in April 1992 as the first single from his album Holding My Own, it reached a peak of number 5 on the Billboard Hot Country Singles & Tracks (now Hot Country Songs) chart in June 1992 and peaked at number 6 on the Canadian RPM Country Tracks chart.

Chart performance
"Gone as a Girl Can Get" debuted on the U.S. Billboard Hot Country Singles & Tracks for the week of April 18, 1992.

Year-end charts

References

1992 singles
George Strait songs
Song recordings produced by Jimmy Bowen
MCA Records singles
1992 songs